The following is a list of episodes from the series Tutenstein.

Series overview

Episodes

Season 1 (2003–2004)

Season 2 (2004–2005)

Season 3 (2006–2007)

Television film (2008)

References 

Lists of American children's animated television series episodes